Brian Keene (born September 22, 1967) is an American author and podcaster, primarily known for his work in horror, dark fantasy, crime fiction, and comic books. He has won the 2014 World Horror Grandmaster Award and two Bram Stoker Awards. In addition to his own original work, Keene has written for media properties such as Doctor Who, Hellboy, Alien, Masters of the Universe, and The X-Files.

Early life 
Keene was born in 1967. He grew up in both Pennsylvania and West Virginia, and many of his books take place in these locales. After graduating high school, he served as a radioman in the U.S. Navy aboard an LPD. After his enlistment ended, Keene worked a variety of jobs before becoming a full-time writer. Among them were stints as a foundry worker, truck driver, data entry clerk, dockworker, telemarketer, customer service representative, repo man, bouncer, disc jockey, salesman, store manager, daycare instructor, custodian. In interviews, he credits this diverse background as the key to the characters that populate his books.

Bibliography

The Rising Series
The Rising (April 2003): Delirium Books (January 2004) Leisure Books
City of the Dead (January 2005): Delirium Books(June 2005) Leisure Books
The Rising: Selected Scenes From the End of the World (2013) Deadite Press
The Rising: Deliverance (2015) Deadite Press
The Fall (Coming Soon)

Earthworm Gods Series
Earthworm Gods (September 2005): Delirium Books, Republished as The Conqueror Worms(May 2006): Leisure Books, Republished again under its intended title Earthworm Gods (December 2012) Deadite Press
Earthworm Gods II: Deluge (2013) Deadite Press (originally serialized on his website)
Earthworm Gods: Selected Scenes From the End of the World (2013) Deadite Press

Levi Stoltzfus Series
Dark Hollow (July 2006): (released in hardcover as The Rutting Season) Bloodletting Press. (February 2008): Leisure Books.
Ghost Walk (August 2008): Leisure Books
A Gathering of Crows (August 2010): Leisure Books
The Last of the Albatwitches (2015) Deadite Press

Clickers Series (with J. F. Gonzalez)
Clickers II: The Next Wave (April 2007) Delirium BooksClickers III: Dagon Rising (2010) Delirium BooksClickers vs. Zombies (2014) Deadite Press

The Lost Level SeriesHole in the World (2019)  Apex PublicationsThe Lost Level (2015) Apex PublicationsThe Chinese Beetle (2016) Thunderstorm Books (chapbook)Return to the Lost Level (2018)  Apex PublicationsBeneath the Lost Level (Coming Soon)

The Labyrinth SeriesThe Seven (2015–18). Online serial. Self-Published through Patreon and physically in 2021Submerged (Ongoing). Online serial. Self-published through Patreon

The Rogan Series (w/Steven L. Shrewsbury)King of the Bastards (2015) Apex PublicationsThrone of the Bastards (2017) Apex PublicationsCurse of the Bastards (2022) Apex Publications

Non-SeriesTerminal (June 2004): Bloodletting Press Revised and expanded (June 2005): Bantam SpectraGhoul (February 2007) Leisure Books (March 2007): Delirium BooksDead Sea (August 2007) Leisure Books (September 2007): Delirium BooksShades (with Geoff Cooper) (November 2007): (Out of Print) Cemetery Dance Publications
 Kill Whitey (April 2008): Cemetery Dance Publications (September 2008): Delirium Books
 Darkness On the Edge of Town (October 2008): Infernal House Press (February 2010):  Leisure Books. Revised and expanded version of previous edition.
 Castaways (February 2009): Leisure Books (March 2009): Bloodletting Press
 Urban Gothic (August 2009): Leisure BooksThe Girl on the Glider (2010) Cemetery Dance PublicationsEntombed (2011) Deadite Press (takes place in same world as Dead Sea but not a direct sequel)Take the Long Way Home (2011) Deadite PressJack's Magic Beans (2011) Deadite PressScratch (2011) Cemetery Dance PublicationsThe Damned Highway (2012) Dark Horse PublishingAlone (2012) Thunderstorm BooksThe Cage (2012) Deadite Sundancing (2013) Thunderstorm BooksAn Occurrence in Crazy Bear Valley (2014) Deadite PressSixty-Five Stirrup Iron Road (2014) Deadite PressThe Complex (2016) Deadite PressPressure  (2016) Thomas Dunne BooksSchool's Out (2017)White Fire (2018) Deadite Press

CollectionsNo Rest For The Wicked  (2001): (Out of Print) Imaginary Worlds Publishing.No Rest For The Wicked Redux (October 2001): (Out of Print) Vox 13 Publishing.Fear of Gravity (2004) Delirium BooksA Little Silver Book of Streetwise Stories (2007) Borderlands PressUnhappy Endings (2008) Delirium BooksA Conspiracy of One (2012) Thunderstorm BooksBlood on the Page (2014) Self-PublishedApocrypha (2014) Thunderstorm BooksLibra Nigrum Scienta Secreta (The Black Book of Secret Knowledge) with J. F. Gonzalez (2015) Arcane Wisdom (Limited release) Where We Live and Die (2015) Lazy Fascist BooksThe Cruelty of Autumn (2015): Thunderstorm Books. Published as a limited hardcover.All Dark, All the Time (2016) Self-PublishedGood Things for Bad People (2017) Thunderstorm Books. Published as a limited hardcover.

Novellas & novelettesTequila's Sunrise (2007): Bloodletting PressRedemption (with Shane Ryan Staley) (2008): HMDead Man Living (Ongoing). Self published through Patreon

Non-FictionEnd of the Road (2016): Cemetery Dance. Weekly column.Brian Keene's Complete History of Horror Fiction (2017-Ongoing): Cemetery Dance. Ongoing column.

Anthologies editedIn Delirium (January 2006): (Delirium Books). Published as a 26-copy leather-bound and a hardcover 274-copy limited hardcover.New Dark Voices II (January 2009): (Delirium Books). Published as a hardcover 150-copy limited hardcover.The Daughters of Inanna (2015): Thunderstorm Books. Published as a limited hardcover.Clickers Forever: A Tribute to J.F. Gonzalez (2018): Thunderstorm Books.

 Awards 
2001 Bram Stoker Award for Superior Achievement in Non-Fiction (for "Jobs In Hell")

2003 Bram Stoker Award for Superior Achievement in First Novel (for "The Rising")

2004 Shocker Award for Non-Fiction (for "Sympathy for the Devil")

2014 World Horror Grand Master Award

2015 Imaginarium Film Festival Awards for Best Screenplay, Best Short Film Genre, and Best Short Film Overall (for "Fast Zombies Suck")

2016 Imadjinn Award for Best Fantasy Novel (for "King of the Bastards")

In 2004 and 2005, Keene spearheaded a Books For Troops program, in which various horror authors supplied free, signed books to American troops serving in Iraq, Afghanistan, and elsewhere around the world. Keene was honored for this in 2005 by the 509th Logistics Fuels Flight Squadron based at Whiteman A.F.B. in Missouri.

In 2014, an American flag was flown in Keene's honor in Afghanistan and presented to him by the United States Army International Security Assistance Force.

Comics and graphic novels
In 2006, three stories from Keene's Fear of Gravity were adapted in the graphic novel Brian Keene's FEAR. The stories were "Castaways", "Red Wood", and the award-winning "The King, in: Yellow".

In 2008, Marvel Comics announced that Keene would be writing for them. His first project for the company was the four-issue limited series for their MAX imprint: Dead of Night: Devil-Slayer.

Keene wrote the 25-issue series "The Last Zombie" for Antarctic Press.

Keene's work for DC Comics has included Doom Patrol, the 2010 "DCU Halloween Special", and "Masters of the Universe: The Origin of Hordak". He was originally part of the writing team for Future's End but left the project along with writer Greg Rucka, also walking away from writing Animal Man and Booster Gold.

In 2017, Keene returned to DC Comics to spearhead "DC House of Horror".

Film adaptations
In 2006, the short story "The Ties That Bind" was turned into a short film, and it had its world premiere on April 4, 2009 at the Garden State Film Festival.
In 2009, Dark Hollow was optioned for film by director Paul Campion.Ghoul was made into a TV movie directed by Gregory Wilson and starring Nolan Gould and debuted on the Chiller Network on April 13, 2012.
In July, 2015, a film adaptation of Keene's short story "Fast Zombies Suck" was released for free via YouTube.
In December, 2016, The Naughty List, a film adaptation of Keene's short story "The Siqquism Who Stole Christmas" was released for free via YouTube and Vimeo.

Podcast
Keene hosts a weekly podcast called The Horror Show With Brian Keene''. Keene and co-hosts Dave Thomas and Mary SanGiovanni discuss horror-related news and events, writing and publishing, and interview various horror authors, publishers and filmmakers.

Personal life
Keene currently lives in York, Pennsylvania.

Since 2012, he has been in a romantic relationship with fellow author Mary SanGiovanni.

On June 5, 2018, he suffered first and second degree burns to his face, and second and third degree burns to his arm after an accident while burning brush on a friend's property (during flood clean-up), and was sent to recuperate in a burn unit. Due to a lack of insurance, a GoFundMe was set up to pay the medical bills.

Philanthropy 

Keene is actively involved in fundraising for the Scares That Care charitable organization.

In August 2017, Keene was made a member of the Board of Directors for the Scares That Care charitable organization.

References

External links

1967 births
Place of birth missing (living people)
21st-century American novelists
American horror writers
American male novelists
Living people
Writers from York, Pennsylvania
Novelists from West Virginia
American male short story writers
21st-century American short story writers
21st-century American male writers
Novelists from Pennsylvania